Politics is the process by which groups of people make decisions. Although the term is generally applied to behavior within civil governments, 
politics is observed in all human group interactions, including corporate, academic, and religious institutions. Politics consists of "social relations involving authority or power. The definition of "politics" from "The Free Dictionary" is the study of political behavior and examines the acquisition and application of power. Politics study include political philosophy, which seeks a rationale for politics and an ethic of public behavior, and public administration, which examines the practices of governance.

0-9
10 Agorot controversy -
1965 Yerevan demonstrations - 
1984 network liberty alliance -
2006 Franco–Italian–Spanish Middle East Peace Plan -
2006 Georgian-Russian espionage controversy -
2006 Norwegian Jostein Gaarder controversy -
2006 United States immigration reform protests -
2007 Georgia helicopter attack incident -
2007 Georgia missile incident -
2007 Georgia plane downing incident -

A
A Man's A Man for A' That -
A Quaker Action Group -
A Scientific Support for Darwinism -
Abalone Alliance -
Ableism -
Abortion -
Absentee ballot -
Absolute majority -
Absolute monarch -
Absolute monarchy -
Absolutism -
Abstention -
Academia -
Acceptance -
Acclamation -
Active measures -
Activism -
Activism at Ohio Wesleyan University -
Activism industry -
Administrative Centre -
Administrative resource -
Adolf Hitler -
Advocacy -
Affair -
Affinity group -
Affirmative action -
Affirmative action bake sale -
African Plate -
African socialism -
Agrarianism -
Agricultural policy -
Alan Placa -
Alexandre de Lameth -
Alice's Meadow -
Alliance for a New Humanity -
Alta controversy -
Alternative Views -
Amalgamation (history) -
Amalgamation (politics) -
American Political Science Association -
American Political Science Review -
Americas -
Americentric -
Amoral -
An Act of Conscience -
An equal amount of products for an equal amount of labor -
Anarchism -
Anarchism in China -
Anarchist communism -
Anarcho-capitalism -
Anarcho-primitivism -
Anarcho-syndicalism -
Anatopia -
Ancien Régime -
Ancien régime -
Ancient Greece -
Animal rights -
Animal testing -
Annexation -
Anthropology -
Anti-Capitalist Convergence -
Anti-Communism -
Anti-nuclear movement -
Anti-nuclear movement in Australia -
Anti-nuclear movement in Germany -
Anti-nuclear movement in the United States -
Anti-Poverty Committee -
Anti-Revisionist -
Anti-Stalinist left -
Anti-authoritarian -
Anti-capitalism -
Anti-clericalism -
Anti-communism -
Anti-cult movement -
Anti-environmentalism -
Anti-incumbency -
Anti-nationalism -
Anti-work -
Antidisestablishmentarianism -
Antimilitarism -
Antinaturalism (politics) -
Antoine Barnave -
Apolitical -
Aptitude -
Arab socialism -
Arbetarnas bildningsförbund -
Arbeter Ring (Workmen's Circle) -
Arctic Refuge drilling controversy -
Arendt, Hannah -
Aristocracy -
Aristotelianism -
Aristotle -
Arizona State University -
Arm's length principle -
Arms Length Management Organisation -
Arrow Cross Party -
Arthashastra -
Artists United Against Apartheid -
Artivist -
Asian values -
Assembly of the Poor -
Asset-based egalitarianism -
Atrocity story -
Attack poodle -
Audre Lorde Project -
Augustine of Hippo -
Augustus -
Ausserparlamentarische Opposition -
Australasia -
Australia -
Austria -
Autarchism -
Authoritarian -
Authoritarianism -
Authority -
Autism Awareness Campaign UK -
Autism Society of America -
Autism Speaks -
Autonomous area -
Average worker's wage -
Averroes -
Aviation ministry -
Avicenna -
Awards -
Axis of Justice

B
BCE -
Babels -
Babeuf -
Balanced job complex -
Ballot -
Ballot access -
Ballot box -
Ballot stuffing -
Barbara Kay controversy -
Bavaria -
Bavarian Soviet Republic -
Behavioralism -
Beirut-Damascus Declaration -
Belgian Labour Party -
Bellum omnium contra omnes -
Benito Mussolini -
Berne International -
Bible -
Bicameralism -
Biosecurity protocol -
Bipartisanship -
Black Front -
Black Panther Party -
Black populism -
Black supremacy -
Board of Control (municipal government) -
Bob Dornan -
Body politic -
Bolivarian Revolution -
Bolshevik -
Bourgeoisie -
Brahmana -
Brandeis University -
Brights movement -
British politics -
Brown Berets (Watsonville) -
Buddhism -
Buddhist socialism -
Bureau-shaping model -
Bureaucracy -
Bureaucrat -
Bureaucratic drift - 
Burmese Way to Socialism -
Butskelism -
By-election

C
Cabotage -
Cacerolazo -
Caging list -
Calculus of voting -
Californians Aware -
Call For Action -
Camp Trans -
Camp for Climate Action -
Campaign for Innocent Victims in Conflict -
Canal Contemporâneo -
Candidate -
Capital -
Capital punishment -
Capitalism -
1920 Carinthian plebiscite -
Carneiro's circumscription theory -
Carnival Against Capital -
Carthaginian peace -
Cartographic aggression -
Catholic -
Celine's laws -
Censorship -
Center for American Politics and Citizenship -
Center for Biological Diversity -
Center for Freedom and Prosperity -
Center for Science in the Public Interest -
Center for the Evaluation of Risks to Human Reproduction -
Central Military Commission -
Centrist -
Chambers of parliament -
Champagne socialist -
Chanakya -
Chandragupta Maurya -
Chappaquiddick incident -
Charismatic authority -
Cherokee freedmen controversy -
Child advocacy -
China watcher -
Chinaman (politics) -
Chinese people -
Christian democracy -
Christian Institute -
Christian democracy -
Christian existentialism -
Christian socialism -
Christianity -
Christians -
The Chronicle of Higher Education -
Chuch'e -
Church and state -
Cicero -
Citizen and consumer movements in Japan -
Citizens' jury -
Citizenship -
City-state -
Civil authority -
Civil libertarianism -
Civil liberties -
Civil registry -
Civil service -
Civil society -
Civil society campaign -
Civilian control of the military -
Civilized -
Clandestine Insurgent Rebel Clown Army -
Clare Boothe Luce Policy Institute -
Class conflict -
Class struggle -
Classical liberalism -
Classless society -
Clean Clothes Campaign -
Cleavage (politics) -
Clergy Letter Project -
Clone (voting) -
Co-option -
Coalition for Comprehensive Immigration Reform -
Coercion -
Colby College -
Cold War -
Collective action -
Collective responsibility -
Collectivism and individualism -
College of William & Mary -
Colonialism -
Command and Control (government) -
Commercial Club of Chicago -
Committee -
Committee of 100 (Delaware) -
Common Purpose UK -
Common minimum programme -
Commonwealth of World Citizens -
Communalism -
Commune (socialism) -
Communism -
Communist -
Communitarianism -
Communities Organized for Public Service -
Community Front in Defense of Land -
Community organizing -
Communization -
Compact theory -
Comparative government -
Comparative politics -
Competitiveness Policy Council -
Compulsory purchase order -
Compulsory voting -
Concession (politics) -
Concord Principles -
Concurrent majority -
Condominium (international law) -
Conference of Socialist Economists -
Confidence and supply -
Confucius -
Congress -
Congress of Vienna -
Congressional Order of Merit -
Conscription -
Consent of the governed -
Conservatism -
Conservatism in Colombia -
Conservatism in the United States -
Consistent life ethic -
Conspiracy (political) -
Constituency -
Constitutional convention (political meeting) -
Constitutional crisis -
Constitutional dictatorship -
Constitutional patriotism -
Constitutionalism -
Consul general -
Consumer organization -
Consumers' Association -
Consumers' Research -
Contact Group (Balkans) -
Contempt of Parliament -
Contentious politics -
Continental Europe -
Controversies related to Islam and Muslims -
Coordination failure -
Cordón Industrial -
Cornelius Castoriadis -
Cornell College -
Cornell University -
Corporate Europe Observatory -
Corporate nationalism -
Corporate oligarchy -
Corporate welfare -
Corporation -
Corrective Revolution -
Cosmopolitanism -
Council on American–Islamic Relations -
Counter-recruitment -
Counter-terrorism -
CountyWatch -
County executive -
Courtesy resolution -
Craftivism -
Crisis management -
Critical international relations theory -
Criticisms of electoralism -
Criticisms of socialism -
Critique: Journal of Socialist Theory -
Critique of capitalism -
Cross-cultural studies -
Cult of personality -
Cultural hegemony -
Culture -
Culture jamming -
Curvilinear disparity -
Custom online panel -
Cyberpolitics -

D
DIY culture -
Daniel Mark Siegel -
Daniel Patrick Moynihan -
Dartmouth College -
De Maistre -
Deanie Frazier -
Debate -
Debeaking -
Declarationism -
Declassification -
Deduction -
Defective by Design -
Definitional concerns in anarchist theory -
Delegate model of representation -
Delegated voting -
Delegation -
Deliberative democracy -
Demand management -
Demarchy -
Democracy -
Democracy Day (United States) - 
Democracy building -
Democracy in Marxism -
Democracy in the Middle East -
Democratic Socialist Organizing Committee -
Democratic Socialists of America -
Democratic World Federalists -
Democratic empire -
Democratic peace theory -
Democratic socialism -
Democratic structuring -
Democratic transhumanism -
Demonstration (people) -
Demos (U.S. think tank) -
Demzilla -
Denialism -
Dependent territory -
Deposition (politics) -
Designated Suppliers Program -
Detournement -
Dialectic -
Diaspora politics -
Dichotomy -
Digital era governance -
Digital object identifier -
Diplomacy -
Direct Action and Democracy Today -
Direct action -
Direct democracy -
Direct rule over Northern Ireland -
Disability Determination Services -
Disarm bush -
Disarmament -
Dissent! (network) -
Distributism -
Divided regions -
Divine Right of Kings -
Dominant-party system -
Donald Trump -
Downhill Battle -
Downsize DC Foundation -
Drug policy -
Drug policy reform -
Dual loyalty -
Dual mandate -
Dual power -
Duumviracy -
Dyke March -
Dykes on Bikes -

E
E. J. Josey -
Early voting -
Earthlings (documentary) -
East Gosforth -
 -
Eco-socialism -
Ecodefense -
Economic activism -
Economic calculation problem -
Economic interventionism -
Economic liberalism -
Economics -
Economy -
Ecotage -
E-Democracy -
Edmund Burke -
Education -
Education Action Group -
Education Otherwise -
Education policy -
Education reform -
Egalitarianism -
Egalitarianism as a Revolt Against Nature and Other Essays -
Egyptian Socialist Youth Organization -
Election -
Election (1999 film) -
Election Day (United Kingdom) -
Election Day Registration -
Election judge -
Election law -
Election management body -
Election monitoring -
Election surprise -
Elections -
Elector -
Electoral Reform Society -
Electoral calendar 2009 -
Electoral college -
Electoral fusion -
Electoral geography -
Electoral power -
Electoral reform -
Electoralism -
Electorate -
Electronic civil disobedience -
Electronic politics -
Elitism -
Elitist -
Emergent democracy -
Empirical -
Empiricism -
Employment -
Enabling act -
Enclave and exclave -
Energy security -
England -
Environmentalism -
Epistemology -
Equality before the law -
Equality of opportunity -
Equality of outcome -
Eric Hoffer -
Eskalera Karakola -
Ethical challenges to autism treatment -
Ethics -
Ethnic nationalism -
Ethnopluralism -
Etoy -
Euripides -
Europe -
Europeans of the Year -
Exclusive mandate -
Executive (government) -
Executive branch -
Executive order (United States) -
Executive power -
Exit poll -
Expansionism -
Expansionist Nationalism -

F
Factual association -
Fahrenheit 9/11 controversy -
Family -
Fanorama -
Fantasy Congress -
Farband -
Farley File -
Fasci Siciliani -
Fascio -
Fascism -
Fascism as an international phenomenon -
Fascist -
Father of the House -
Favourite -
Federal Returning Officer -
Federalism -
Feminism -
Ferdowsi -
Fernand Brouez -
Feuillant -
Fifth power -
Fiscal conservatism -
Five-point electoral law -
Fixed-term election -
Foco -
Folkhemmet -
Food politics -
For a New Liberty: The Libertarian Manifesto -
Foreign policy -
Foreign policy analysis -
France -
Franchise activism -
Free Software Foundation -
Free market -
Free migration -
Free the Old Head of Kinsale -
Freedom (political) -
Freedom Center Western Massachusetts -
Freedom of speech -
Freedom of the press -
French Constitution of 1793 -
French Constitution of 1795 -
French Directory -
French Fifth Republic -
French Revolution -
French Senate -
Front-runner -
Fu Xiancai -
Fudgie Frottage -
Full slate -
Functionalism in international relations -
Funky Dragon -

G
G. William Domhoff -
Galicianism (Galicia) -
Game theory -
Gandhian economics -
Gastald -
Gaullism -
Gay marriage -
Gay rights -
General election -
Generalissimo -
Generation Engage or GenerationEngage -
Geopolitics -
George Allen (U.S. politician) -
George Lakoff -
Georgetown University -
Gerard Toal -
German student movement -
Germanophile -
Get Up, Stand Up: The Story of Pop and Protest -
Girondins -
Girondist -
Glenn W. Smith -
Global Environment and Trade Study -
Global Justice (organization) -
Global Justice Movement -
Global citizens movement -
Global politics -
Global power barometer -
Globalism -
Globalization -
Glossary of the French Revolution -
Godless Americans March on Washington -
Golden Liberty -
Goodhart's law -
Goulash Communism -
Governance -
Government -
Government-organized demonstration -
Government Gazette of South Africa -
Government in exile -
Government procurement -
Government simulation game -
Grapus -
Grassroots Radio Coalition -
Great American Boycott -
Great Britain -
Great power -
Green anarchism -
Green lending -
Green liberalism -
Green politics -
Green syndicalism -
Greenpeace -
Guardian of Zion Award -
Guevarism -
Guided Democracy -
Gun control -
Gun rights -

H
Hacktivism -
Hacktivismo -
Hacktivist News Service -
Haldane principle -
Handover -
Hannah Arendt -
Haringey Solidarity Group -
Harvard University -
Hasbara -
Haymarket Books -
He who does not work, neither shall he eat -
Head of state succession -
Heads of state -
Health politics - 
Health care politics -
Health care reform -
Health department -
Hegemonic stability theory -
Hendrix College -
Herbert Baxter Adams -
Hereditary Education Policy -
Herzl Award -
Hesiod -
Hierarchical organization -
High politics -
Hillary Rodham cattle futures controversy -
Hindi-Urdu controversy -
Hindmarsh Island bridge controversy -
Hindu nationalism -
Hindutva -
Historical institutionalism -
History -
History of India -
History of democracy -
History of fundamentalist Islam in Iran -
History of political science -
History of socialism -
History of terrorism -
Hobbes -
Home Nations -
Homer -
Householder Franchise -
Hudson Guild -
Human chain -
Human geography -
Human settlement -
Human shield -
Human shield action to Iraq -
Hung parliament -
Hunt Saboteurs Association -
Husting -
Hypatus -

I
Icarus Project -
Idealism in international relations -
Ideologies of parties -
Ideology -
Identity politics -
Ilısu Dam Campaign -
Imanol Ordorika Sacristán -
Immigration policy -
Immigration reduction -
Immigration reform -
In His Steps -
Inclusive Democracy -
Income redistribution -
Independence -
Independence referendum -
Independent Australian Jewish Voices -
Independent Media Center -
India -
Indirect election -
Individualist anarchism -
Indophile -
Industrialisation -
Indybay -
Infighting -
Information science -
Inge Scholl -
Initiative -
Innovation -
Institute for Global Communications -
Institute for Humane Studies -
Institutional analysis -
Integral Nationalism -
Integral humanism -
Inter-Parliamentary Union -
Interest aggregation -
Interest articulation -
Intergovernmental -
Internal security -
International Action -
International Action Center -
International Falcon Movement -
International Foundation for Electoral Systems
International Socialist Organization -
International Solidarity Movement -
International Working Union of Socialist Parties -
International law -
International relations -
International relations theory -
International trade -
Internationalism (politics) -
Internet censorship -
Internet taxation -
Intersectionality -
Invisible Party -
Ion Sancho (politician) -
Iraq and Afghanistan Veterans of America -
Irish Socialist Network -
Islamic -
Islamic Thinkers Society -
Islamic state -
Islamism -
Island country -
Isolationism -
Israeli–Palestinian conflict -
Italy -

J
Jamahiriya -
James E. Hansen -
Jamil Hussein controversy -
Jan Wong controversy -
Japanese Imperial succession controversy -
Jean-Jacques Rousseau -
Jean Schmidt -
Jeffersonian political philosophy -
Jerusalem Center for Public Affairs -
Jesus Ledesma Aguilar -
Jewish Socialists' Group -
John Carver (board policy) -
John Locke -
John Mordaunt Trust -
John Rawls -
John Stuart Mill -
Johns Hopkins University -
Joint electorate -
Joint session -
Joseph Stalin -
Juche -
Judicial -
Judicial activism -
Judicial branch -
Judicial power -
Judicial tyranny -
Judiciary -
Julius Caesar -
Junge Wilde -
Junta (Habsburg) -
Junta (Peninsular War) -
Jura federation -
Jurisdiction -
Justice at Stake Campaign -

K
Karl Marx -
Karl Popper -
Keep Ireland Open -
Keynesian economics -
Kingdom of Sardinia -
Kingmaker -
Klemens von Metternich -
Korean Immigrant Workers Advocates -
Kremlinology -

L
La Reunion (Dallas) -
Labor Zionism -
Labour Party (UK) -
Labour law -
Labour movement -
Labour voucher -
Laissez-faire -
Laissez-faire capitalism -
Laissez faire -
Lake Ontario Waterkeeper -
Land reform -
Landmine Survivors Network -
Landslide victory -
Lange Model -
Language policy -
Law -
Law and order (politics) -
Law collective -
Law making -
Lawrence O'Brien Award -
Leaderless resistance -
League (politics) -
League of Coloured Peoples -
Left-Right politics -
Left-Wing Communism: An Infantile Disorder -
Left-right politics -
Left-wing -
Left-wing politics -
Left wing -
Legal domination -
Legal research -
Legal system -
Legislative -
Legislative Assembly (France) -
Legislative branch -
Legislative power -
Legislative veto -
Legislative violence -
Legislature -
Legitimating ideology -
Lenin -
Les Dégonflés -
Leviathan -
Leviathan (book) -
Liberal -
Liberal democracy -
Liberalism -
Liberalism in Colombia -
Liberalism in the United States -
Liberals -
Liberation theology -
Libertarian Marxism -
Libertarian Party of Michigan -
Libertarian Socialism -
Libertarian socialism -
Libertarianism -
Libertarians -
Liberty -
Liberty Tree Foundation for the Democratic Revolution -
Line-item veto -
Linestanding -
Linguistics -
Liquid democracy -
Lishenets -
List of political scientists -
Liverpool Social Forum -
Livy -
Local Works -
Local government -
Local self-government -
Localism -
Localism (politics) -
London School of Economics -
Louis XVIII of France -
Luck egalitarianism -
Luxemburgism -

M
MVDDS dispute -
Machiavellianism -
Macmillan Publishers -
Maimonides -
Maine Video Activists Network -
Majoritarianism -
Majority -
Malicious compliance -
Management -
Mandate (politics) -
Mao Zedong -
Maoism -
Margaret Thatcher -
Marginal seat -
Marijuana Policy Project -
Market populism -
Market socialism -
Marriage gap -
Marxism -
Marxism-Leninism -
Marxist international relations theory -
Marxist philosophy -
Marxist revisionism -
Mass mobilization -
Mass politics -
Massachusetts Institute of Technology -
Maternity Coalition -
Matriarchy -
Maurya Empire -
Max Weber -
Maximilien Robespierre -
May Conspiracy -
May Day -
Mayday Mutual Aid Medical Station -
Means of production -
Media activism -
Mediastrike -
Medical marijuana -
Melanesia -
Melanesian socialism -
Mercantilism -
Merchants Club -
Metapolitics -
Metropolitan municipality -
Miami model -
Micronesia -
Middle Ages -
Mierscheid Law -
Mike Lesser -
Militant -
Militarism -
Military geography -
Minarchism -
Minimal effects hypothesis -
Minimum wage -
Ministry (collective executive) -
Ministry (government department) -
Minoritarianism -
Minorities -
Miscegenation -
Mission-based organization -
Mobutism -
Mock election -
Modern American liberalism -
Monarchism -
Monarchy -
Monash University -
Money bill -
Monkeywrenching -ة
Montebello High School flag flipping incident, 2006 -
Moral Politics -
Moral high ground -
Moral philosophy -
Morality -
Motion of no confidence -
Motyl's Theory of the Empire -
Mount Holyoke College -
MoveOn.org ad controversy -
Movement for a New Society -
Multi-party system -
Multiculturalism -
Municipal corporation -
Municipal services -
Music and politics -
Muslim Association of Britain -
Muslim Public Affairs Committee UK -
Muslim Public Affairs Council -
Māori protest movement -

N
NATO expansion -
NLRB election procedures -
NY Salon -
Name recognition -
Nancy Program -
Napoleon Bonaparte -
Nasserism -
Nation -
Nation-state -
National Action Party (Mexico) -
National Alliance on Mental Illness -
National American Woman Suffrage Association -
National Assembly -
National Assembly of France -
National Association of Old IRA -
National Association of Railroad Passengers -
National Association of Secretaries of State -
National Bolshevism -
National Breast Cancer Awareness Month -
National Civic League -
National Convention -
National Italian American Foundation -
National Korean American Service & Education Consortium -
National League of Cities -
National Maternity Action Plan -
National Organization for the Reform of Marijuana Laws -
National Priority Projects -
National Security Whistleblowers Coalition -
National Socialist Program -
National Vaccine Information Center -
National Youth Rights Association -
National heritage area -
National language -
National socialism -
Nationalism -
Nationalist activism -
Natural rights -
Nature versus nurture -
Nazi -
Nazism -
Neo-Gramscianism -
Neo-Zionism -
Neo-medievalism -
Neo-populism -
Neoconservatism -
Neoliberalism -
Neoliberalism (international relations) -
Neomercantilism -
Neosocialism -
Netherlands -
Netroots -
Nevada Desert Experience -
New Democracy -
New Jersey Redistricting Commission -
New Left -
New Politics (magazine) -
New Revolutionary Alternative -
New York University -
Newt Gingrich -
Niccolò Machiavelli -
No-cost campaign -
No Border network -
Noam Chomsky -
Nolan Chart -
Nolan chart -
Nominating committee -
Nomination rules - 
Non-governmental organizations -
Non-human electoral candidates -
Non-intervention -
Non-partisan democracy -
Nonproliferation -
Nonviolence -
Nonviolence International -
Norberto Bobbio -
Norm Peterson (politician) -
Normative -
North America -
Northeast Action -
Northern Arizona University -
Nothing About Us Without Us -
Nothing But Nets -
Nuclear-Free Future Award -
Nuclear testing -

O
Objectivism and libertarianism -
Occidental College -
Occupation (protest) -
Ochlocracy -
Office politics -
Official language -
Old right -
Oligarchy -
Omaha Platform -
On Liberty -
One People's Project -
Open campaign -
Open government -
Open politics -
Opposition (politics) -
Opposition to immigration -
Orange Revolution
Originalism -
Osman Ahmed Osman -
Ostracism -
Outer Continental Shelf -
Outing -
Outlying territory -

P
PDF -
PIANZEA -
Pacific Environment -
Pacifism -
Pale -
Paleoconservatism -
Paleolibertarianism -
Palestine Media Watch -
Pali Canon -
Parachute candidate -
Paradox of voting -
Parent-teacher association -
Parents and citizens -
Parity of esteem -
Parliamentary informatics -
Parliamentary session -
Parochialism -
Participatory economics -
Participatory politics -
Partition (politics) -
Partners in Population and Development -
Partnership for a Drug-Free America -
Party-line vote -
Party platform -
Party political broadcast -
Party system -
Passive obedience -
Patriarchy -
Patriotism -
Peace and conflict studies -
Peace studies -
Peace walk -
Peacefire -
People's Justice Party (UK) -
People & Planet -
Peronism -
Pete Stark -
Peter F. Paul -
Peterloo Massacre -
Petticoat affair -
Pharaonism -
Pharisees -
PharmFree -
Philosopher -
Philosophical anarchism -
Philosophy -
Philosophy, Politics, and Economics -
Pi Sigma Alpha -
Pieing -
Plato -
Plumi -
Plutarch -
Pochvennichestvo -
Policy -
Policy analysis -
Policy by press release -
Policy studies -
Polish American Congress -
Polish American Congress of Eastern Massachusetts -
Political Campaigning -
Political Film Society -
Political Management -
Political activism -
Political agenda -
Political authorities -
Political behavior -
Political bias -
Political campaign -
Political campaign staff -
Political capital -
Political communications -
Political compass -
Political corruption -
Political crime -
Political criticism -
Political culture -
Political decoy -
Political dissent -
Political economy -
Political entrepreneur -
Political faction -
Political game -
Political geography -
Political history -
Political institution -
Political labels -
Political libel -
Political literacy -
Political media -
Political movement -
Political participation -
Political parties -
Political parties of the world -
Political party -
Political philosophy -
Political power -
Political psychology -
Political rights -
Political science -
Political science of religion -
Political scientist -
Political simulation -
Political socialization -
Political sociology -
Political spectacle -
Political spectrum -
Political statement -
Political symbolism -
Political system -
Political systems -
Political t-shirt -
Political theatre -
Political theology -
Political theory -
Political unitarism -
Politically exposed person -
Politician -
Politicization -
Politicization of science -
Politico -
Politico-media complex -
Politics -
Politics (Aristotle) -
Politics (disambiguation) -
Politics by country -
Politics by subdivision -
Politics in fiction -
Polity -
Polling station -
Pollster -
Polybius -
Polynesia -
Popular socialism -
Popularism -
Populism -
Porkbusters -
Positive (social sciences) -
Positive political theory -
Post-democracy -
Post-modern -
Post-structuralist -
Post-war consensus -
Postal voting -
Postmodern -
power broker -
Power in international relations -
Power transition theory -
Power vacuum -
Prague Party Conference -
Pre-Marx socialists -
Prebendalism -
President's Council on Service and Civic Participation -
President-elect -
Presidential succession -
Prime Minister -
Princeton Project 55 -
Princeton University -
Principate -
Private defense agency -
Private property -
Privatization -
Pro-life -
Pro-war -
Pro forma -
Probing amendment -
Productive forces -
Progg -
Progress For America -
Progressive Era -
Progressivism -
Project Camelot -
Project Cybersyn -
Proletarian internationalism -
Proletarian revolution -
Proletariat -
Prometheus Radio Project -
Promoting adversaries -
Pronunciamiento -
Property rights -
Protest -
Protest vote -
Provisional ballot -
Proxy voting -
Prussia -
Psephology -
Pseudo-secularism -
Psychogeography -
Psychology -
Public Health Security and Bioterrorism Preparedness Response Act -
Public administration -
Public benefit corporation -
Public law -
Public management -
Public opinion -
Public participation -
Public policy -
Public property -
Public sector -
Public trust -
Public value -
Publics -
Publixtheatre Caravan -
Punk ideologies -
Pure race -
Purple Rain Protest -

Q
Queeruption -
Quick count -
Quota Borda system -

R
R. Doug Lewis -
RISE International -
Race relations -
Racial segregation -
Racist -
Radical Youth (Aotearoa New Zealand) -
Radical cheerleading -
Radical democracy -
Radicalism (historical) -
Radicalization -
Radium Girls -
Rainbow/PUSH -
Reactionary -
Realigning election -
Realism in international relations -
Recall election -
Red-baiting -
Red Falcons -
Red Guard Party (United States) -
Red flag (politics) -
Red inverted triangle -
Redbud Woods controversy -
Redistribution of wealth -
Referendum -
Reflections on the Revolution in France -
Reformism -
Refusal to serve in the Israeli military -
Refuse and Resist -
Refused ballot -
Regenesis Movement -
Regime -
Regional autonomy -
Regional hegemony -
Regional state -
Regionalism -
Religion -
Religious Coalition for Reproductive Choice -
Religious socialism -
Renaissance -
Rent strike -
Representative democracy -
Republic of China -
Republican In Name Only -
Republican Party (United States) -
Republicanism -
Reserved political positions -
Returning Officer -
Reverb (non-profit) -
Reverse discrimination -
Revisionist Zionism -
Revolution -
Revolution from above -
Revolutionary Knitting Circle -
Revolutionary movement -
Revolutionary socialism -
Revolutions of 1848 -
Rhythms of resistance -
Richard Carmona -
Richard L. Hasen -
Rig-Veda -
Right-wing -
Right-wing politics -
Right of conquest -
Right of foreigners to vote -
Right socialism -
Right wing -
Rights -
Rights and responsibilities of marriages in the United States -
Rise of nationalism in Europe -
Rita Borsellino -
Robert Dahl -
Robert F. Thompson -
Robert Filmer -
Robert Stewart, Viscount Castlereagh -
Roemer Model of Political Competition -
Roman Empire -
Roman Republic -
Ronald Reagan -
Roosevelt Institution -
Root Force -
Roots of Resistance -
Rosenberg Fund for Children -
Rotvoll controversy -
Royal Commission -
Royal Commissions Act 1902 -
Rubaiyat of Omar Khayyam -
Rudy Giuliani promotions of Bernard Kerik -
Ruling clique -
Rump organization -
Russian Procurement -
Russian Revolution of 1917 -

S
Sabotage -
Sadducees -
Safe seat -
Safer Alternative for Enjoyable Recreation -
Samhita -
Samuel Gompers -
Sangonet -
Santorum controversy -
Satiric misspelling -
School of the Americas Watch -
Science, Technology, & International Affairs -
Science for the People -
Science policy -
Scientific Socialism -
Scottish Politician of the Year -
Seat of government -
Seaweed rebellion -
Secret ballot -
Section 28 -
Sectionalism -
Secularism -
Security and Peace -
Self-determination -
Senate Document -
Separate electorate -
Separation of church and state -
Separation of powers -
Separatism -
Settler colonialism -
Sexual Freedom League -
Shadow Cabinet -
Shadow Minister -
Signoria of Florence -
Simple majority -
Single-issue politics -
One-party state -
Sinistrisme -
Sister Boom-Boom -
Sister Roma -
Sitdown strike -
Situational ethics -
Skinheads Against Racial Prejudice -
Slacktivism -
Slavophile -
Small-l libertarianism -
Smith College -
Social-imperialism -
Social Credit -
Social Solidarity -
Social class -
Social contract -
Social democracy -
Social democratic -
Social democrats -
Social fascism -
Social liberalism -
Social philosophy -
Social policy -
Social psychology -
Social science -
Social sciences -
Social sector -
Social welfare provision -
Socialism -
Socialism (book) -
Socialism and LGBT rights -
Socialism and social democracy in Canada -
Socialism of the 21st century -
Socialist Action (disambiguation) -
Socialist Legality -
Socialist Register -
Socialist Resistance -
Socialist Review (US) -
Socialist Studies (1981) -
Socialist Worker (Aotearoa) -
Socialist competition -
Socialist economics -
Socialist feminism -
Socialist law -
Socialist realism -
Socialist state -
Society -
Sociology -
Soft despotism -
Soft paternalism -
Sokwanele -
Somaly Mam Foundation -
Songun -
Sortition -
Sound truck -
South America -
South End Press -
Southeast Asian Leaders -
Southern Agrarians -
Southwest Asia -
Sovereign -
Sovereign state -
Sovereignty -
Soviet (council) -
Soviet Union -
Soviet democracy -
Soviet republic (system of government) -
Space policy -
Spanish Constitution of 1812 -
Speaker of the Senate -
Spokescouncil -
St. Petersburg Democratic Club (United States) -
Stalinism -
Stand Up Speak Up -
Starve the beast -
State (polity) -
State Electoral Office -
State of emergency -
State of nature -
State socialism -
Stateless nation -
Statistics -
Statoid -
Stem cell -
Stem cell controversy -
Stephanie Cutter -
Steven Lukes -
Strategic Urban Planning -
Strategic geography -
Strategic planning -
Street-level bureaucracy -
Street protester -
Strength through Peace -
Student Activity Fee -
Student Global AIDS Campaign -
Student activism -
Student voice -
Students Partnership Worldwide -
Students for Justice in Palestine -
Stump speech (politics) -
Substantive representation -
Suffrage -
Sultanism -
Summer capital -
Supermajority -
Superpower -
Supranational -
Supranational aspects of international organizations -
Supremacism -
Surveillance state -
Susan Bernecker -
Sustainable procurement -
Swing vote -
Swingometer -
Syncretic politics -
Synonyms -
Systematic ideology -
Systems theory in political science -

T
TV turnoff -
Tactical media -
Tactical politics -
Taistoism -
Taiwan -
Take Pride in America -
Takshashila University -
Talk About Curing Autism -
Tax Justice Network -
Tax increment financing -
Tax reform -
Technology and society -
Tellurocracy -
Temporary capital -
Tenant-in-chief -
Territorial peace theory -
Territory (country subdivision) -
Terrorism -
Tetracameralism -
Thalassocracy -

The Age of Enlightenment -
The Analects of Confucius -
The Communist Manifesto -
The Denver Principles -
The Internationale -
The Lawless State -
The Legislative Assembly and the fall of the French monarchy -
The Lysistrata Project (protest) -
The Masque of Anarchy -
The Mischief Makers -
The Mountain -
The People Speak -
The Prince -
The Ragged Trousered Philanthropists -
The Republic -
The Social Contract -
The Soul of Man under Socialism -
The Triple Revolution -
The Two Souls of Socialism -

Theocracy -
Theology -
Theories of Political Behavior -
Theories of political behavior -
Theories of state -
Thermidorian Reaction -
Thessaloniki bombings of 1903 -
Think tank -
Third-worldism -
Thomas Boddington -
Thomas Hobbes -
Thomas Sowell -
Three-cornered-contest -
ThreeBallot -
Three Principles of the People -
Three powers of the State -
Thucydides -
Ticket (election) -
Ticket splitters -
Timarchy -
Timeline of women's rights (other than voting) -
Timeline of women's suffrage -
To the Finland Station -
Tory Socialism -
Totalitarian -
Totalitarianism -
Townsite -
Trade facilitation -
Traditional domination -
Traffic light coalition -
Transitology -
Transparency (humanities) -
Transparency International -
Transpartisan -
Treatment Advocacy Center -
Tree pinning -
Tree sitting -
Tree spiking -
Trent Lott -
Trial (law) -
Tricameralism -
Tripartite classification of authority -
Triple oppression -
Triumphalism -
Tully Satre -
Turkey -
Turkey Youth Union -
Turn Your Back on Bush -
Turner Controversy -
Twilight Club -
Two-party system -
Two Treatises of Government -
Types of socialism -
Tyranny -
Tyrant -

U
U.S. Committee for Human Rights in North Korea -
UK Social Centre Network -
Ukraine without Kuchma -
Unaffiliated voter -
Underground Literary Alliance -
Unicameralism -
Unilateral disarmament -
Union Calendar -
Unitary state -
United Kingdom -
United States -
United States-Russia mutual detargeting -
United States Republican Party presidential nomination, 2008 -
United States Supreme Court -
United We Stand America -
Universal health care -
Universal manhood suffrage -
Universal suffrage -
University of California, Santa Cruz -
University of Essex -
University of Idaho -
University of Puget Sound -
University of Sydney -
University of Texas at Austin -
University of Ulster -
University reform in Argentina -
Up with People -
Uranium mining controversy in Kakadu National Park -
Urban75 -
Uribism -
Urmia Manifesto of the United Free Assyria -
Ursinus College -
Use of Sciences Po -
Utah League of Cities and Towns -
Utopia -
Utopian socialism -

V
VDARE -
Vanguard party -
Vanguardism -
Vanishing mediator -
Varieties of democracy -
Veterans of Future Wars -
Veto -
Vice Consul -
Victoria University of Wellington -
Villagization -
Virgil Goode -
Virginians Against Drug Violence -
Virtue -
Vladimir Lenin -
Vote allocation -
Vote counting system -
Vote pairing -
Votebank -
Voter database -
Voter fatigue -
Voter registration -
Voter turnout -
Voting -
Voting bloc -
Voting machine -
Voting system -
Voting systems -

W
WOMBLES -
Wage labour -
Wage slavery -
Wages -
War -
War on Terrorism -
Ward Churchill 9/11 essay controversy -
Washington and Lee University -
Water fluoridation controversy -
Week of Silence -
Welfare reform -
West Gosforth -
West Side Nut Club -
Western Journalism Center -
Which? -
Whip (politics) -
Whirl-Mart -
White-collar worker -
White Poppy -
White nationalism -
White separatism -
White supremacy -
Whitewash (censorship) -
Willard Saulsbury, Sr. -
Winston Churchill -
Wipeout (elections) -
Women's suffrage -
Women's suffrage in South Carolina -
Women in politics -
Women of Color Resource Center -
Worker center -
Workers' Awaaz -
Workers' control -
Workers' council -
Workers' self-management -
Working class -
World's Smallest Political Quiz -
World Network of Users and Survivors of Psychiatry -
World War II -
World cultures -
World government -
World government in science fiction -
World revolution -
Writ of election -
Write-in candidate -

X
Xenophon -

Y
YearlyKos -
Young Lords -
Young Socialist Alliance -
Youth pride -
Youth activism -
Youth council -
Youth politics -
Youth vote -

Z
Zikism -
Zionist Freedom Alliance -
Zombie Lurch -
Zvakwana -
Ürün

Footnotes

Politics
Politics topics